Brahma Chellaney is a geostrategist, public intellectual, columnist and author on geostrategic affairs.
He is a professor of strategic studies at the Centre for Policy Research in New Delhi.
He was a member of India's National Security Advisory Board and an author of its draft nuclear doctrine. 
He is a regular columnist for Project Syndicate,
and writes for numerous other international publications. He is the author of nine books on geostrategic affairs, of which Asian Juggernaut was a best-seller and Water: Asia's New Battleground received the $20,000 Bernard Schwartz Award.

Education and career
Chellaney was born in New Delhi. After passing the Senior Cambridge examination at Mount St. Mary's School, India, he did a Bachelor of Arts (Honours) from Hindu College, University of Delhi and a Master of Arts from the Delhi School of Economics. He holds a PhD in international studies from the Jawaharlal Nehru University.

He is a Professor of Strategic Studies at the New Delhi-based Centre for Policy Research; a Richard von Weizsäcker Fellow with the Robert Bosch Academy in Berlin; and a nonresident affiliate with the International Centre for the Study of Radicalization at King's College London.
In the mid-2000s, he was a member of the Indian government's Policy Advisory Group, which was chaired by the External Affairs Minister of India. Before that, he was an adviser to India’s National Security Council, serving as convener of the External Security Group of the National Security Advisory Board.

The institutions where he has held appointments include Harvard University, the Norwegian Nobel Institute, the Brookings Institution, the Paul H. Nitze School of Advanced International Studies at the Johns Hopkins University, and the Australian National University. Graham Tobin from the University of South Florida has as described Chellaney’s geopolitical analyses as astute and critical.

Ideas 
Chellaney was described in The New York Times in 1999 as "one of the independent experts who helped draft India's proposed nuclear doctrine".  The country's draft nuclear doctrine was publicly released in August 1999. 

Chellaney coined the term debt-trap diplomacy to describe how the Chinese government leverages the debt burden of smaller countries for geopolitical ends.
He saw 'debt trap diplomacy' in China's handling of Sri Lanka's debt distress by taking over its Hambantota port on a long-term lease.
The thesis caught on and began to be used widely, becoming "something approaching conventional wisdom", especially in Washington DC.
Other scholars have disputed the assessment, arguing that Chinese finance was not the source of Sri Lanka’s financial distress.

Publications
Chellaney is the author of nine books. Two of his most recent books relate to the geopolitics of water resources. Another book, an international best-seller, focuses on how a fast-rising Asia has become the defining fulcrum of global geopolitical change.

His peer-reviewed papers have been published in a number of journals, including International Security (journal), Survival (journal), Nature (journal), Orbis (journal), Asian Survey, Studies in Conflict & Terrorism, Disarmament, The Washington Quarterly, Security Studies (journal) and Politique étrangère.

He is also a prolific newspaper essayist. Besides being a columnist for Project Syndicate, he publishes regularly in The Globe and Mail, The Japan Times, Nikkei Asia, South China Morning Post, Hindustan Times and The Times of India. He has also been a contributor to The Wall Street Journal, The Guardian, The New York Times, and other newspapers and magazines.

Selected books
 Asian Juggernaut: The Rise of China, India and Japan, HarperCollins USA, 2010. 
 Water, Peace, and War: Confronting the Global Water Crisis, Rowman & Littlefield, 2015. 
 Water: Asia's New Battleground, Georgetown University Press, 2019.

Reception
Chellaney received the $20,000 Bernard Schwartz Award from the New York-based Asia Society for his work, Water: Asia's New Battleground, published by Georgetown University Press. The award recognises outstanding contributions regarding contemporary Asian affairs and US-Asia relations.

References

External links

 Stagecraft and Statecraft: Brahma Chellaney's website

1962 births
Living people
Indian academics